The Urban Mass Transportation Act of 1964 (USC Title 49, Chapter 53 ) provided $375 million for large-scale urban public or private rail projects in the form of matching funds to cities and states. The Urban Mass Transportation Administration (now the Federal Transit Administration) was created.  It provided capital grants for up to 50% of the cost of transit improvements.

Like the earlier Buy American Act of 1933, and the later "Buy America" section of the Surface Transportation Assistance Act of 1982, the act contained provision to encourage U.S. government funds to be spent on U.S.-made products.

See also
 Urban Mass Transportation Act of 1970
 National Mass Transportation Assistance Act of 1974

References

External links
 Urban Mass Transportation Act of 1964 ( details) as enacted in the US Statutes at Large

1964 in law
United States federal transportation legislation
United States railroad regulation
1964 in rail transport
88th United States Congress
Federal assistance in the United States